James Harty Frew (21 May 1892 – 27 April 1967) was a Scottish professional footballer who played as a left back.

Career
Born in Kinghorn, Frew played for Kilsyth Emmet, Alloa Athletic, Newcastle City, Hearts, Leeds United and Bradford City.

While at Hearts, he made one appearance for Scotland in an unofficial wartime international in 1916 along with club teammate Willie Wilson. By that time both men  had enlisted in 'McCrae's Battalion' of the Royal Scots, and Frew also served in the Royal Garrison Artillery during the conflict.

For Leeds United he made 96 appearances in the Football League, plus three in the FA Cup.

For Bradford City he made 48 appearances in the Football League.

Sources

References

1892 births
1967 deaths
Scottish footballers
Alloa Athletic F.C. players
Heart of Midlothian F.C. players
Leeds United F.C. players
Bradford City A.F.C. players
English Football League players
Association football fullbacks
British Army personnel of World War I
Royal Garrison Artillery soldiers
Royal Scots soldiers
McCrae's Battalion
Footballers from Fife
People from Kinghorn
Scottish Football League players
Scotland wartime international footballers
Military personnel from Fife